Public artworks in Hillsboro, Oregon include:

 Barometer (2013)
 Bird Child Travels Through History (2014), Angelina Marino-Heidel
 Burger Family
 Champion Flock of Weed Eaters (2015)
 Chief Kno-Tah
 The Conflict (2017)
 Dancing Chairs (2009)
 Dynamic Orbits (2016), Adrian Litman
 Eastbound Train (2017)
 El Número Seis (2012)
 Fly with the Sun II (2014)
 Flight (2004)
 Get Down With da Dirt! (2014)
 The Grand Staircase (2005)
 Head Over Heels (2017)
 Hello Neighbor
 Jackson Bottom Mist (2011)
 Kids Games (2004)
 Magnolia Park (2008)
 Main Street Bridge Lighting (2015)
 Mother Earth, Father Time (2004)
 Oasis Gargoyles (2016)
 On Main Street in Downtown Hillsboro (2017)
 Quintessential Eve (2012)
 Reflected Past (2015)
 Riverbed (2004)
 Rood Bridge Park with Mid Century Modern Style (2014)
 Rose Garden (2011)
 Seeds of Orenco (2016)
 Sequoia Collection
 Sequoia Frond (2004)
 Shute Park Library Pavers (2014)
 Shute Seeds (2016)
 Stewards Gateway (2013)
 Symphony of Light (2013)
 Unrushed, at the Venetian (2015)
 Walking Warrior (2012)
 Wine with Friends (2012)

References

External links

 Public Art Program, Hillsboro, Oregon

Public art
Hillsboro
Hillsboro, Oregon